Hurso (Somali language: Huursoo) is a town in eastern Ethiopia. It is one of four towns in Erer woreda.

Hurso was served by a station on the Ethio-Djibouti Railways. South of the town is Camp Hurso, where members of the 294th Infantry Regiment, Guam Army National Guard, U.S. Army, spent a year training soldiers of the Ethiopian National Defense Force in 2006.

Hurso was where the founding meeting of the Ethiopian Somali Democratic League was held, under the sponsorship of the Ethiopian People's Revolutionary Democratic Front and the leadership of the two Somali members of the federal cabinet, Federal Minister Abdul Mejid Hussein and Federal Vice-Minister Samsudin Ahmed.

In1997 Hurso was librated by Eltireh troops: Gurugra branch of WSLF (Western Somalia Libration Front). Ethiopia had the largest casualties at Hurso, Cubans and Russians were sent in to fight the Somalis. After the Somalis were forced to retreat, it result in the 1978 Gurgura farms Hurso to be confiscated by the Derg. 1991 GLF formed and fought to librate Hurso, Erer, Gota and Dire Dawa. 1994 - 1995 after the formation of the new government by Meles Zenawi, the Gurgura of Hurso, Erer and Dire Dawa reattacked with new tackticks which resulted in complete confiscation of Gurgura farms of Hurso again and displaced Gurgura people all over the Somali Region, Djibouti, Somaliland and the Oromo region. Executive oder was signed to shoot and kill any Gurgura who returned to Hurso and attempted to take their homes or farms back and as of 2022 this is still the case.

Demographics 
The town's inhabitants belong to mainly Gacalwaaq subclan of the Gurgura Madaxweyne Dir who mostly speak Somali and some Oromo. As of recent, due to sever droughts in the region some of the neighbouring issa people have come to or near the town for farming or to graze their livestock. Based on figures from the Central Statistical Agency of Ethiopia published in 2005, Erer has an estimated total population of 3,318 of whom 1,695 are men and 1,623 women. The 1997 census reported this town had a total population of 2,226 of whom 1,120 were men and 1,106 women. The three largest ethnic groups reported in this town were the Gurgura (Somali) (59.88%), the Oromo (22.46%), and the Amhara (11.99%); all other ethnic groups made up the remaining 5.67% of the residents.

References 

Populated places in the Somali Region

History